The term vismod is an abbreviation of the term visually modified, and is used by the elements of the United States Department of Defense to refer to any vehicle, aircraft, or other object that has been altered to simulate equipment used by an enemy for training purposes, often by specialized units referred to as the OpFor or opposing force. It is also sometimes used in filmmaking and television production to simulate real-world military equipment that is required for a scene in a television show or movie but cannot be procured due to financial or other complications. Below are some of the most well-known examples of vismod usage.

Vismods in the US Navy and US Air Force

The United States Navy and Air Force were the first branches of the military to use vismods effectively for training purposes in response to appalling air-to-air combat performance of their pilots during the Vietnam War, taking A-4 Skyhawks and F-5 Freedom Fighters and painting them in the colors of Soviet and Warsaw Pact aircraft, complete with red star insignia. These were used as 'adversary' aircraft at the Navy's Top Gun program at Marine Corps Air Station Miramar and the Air Force's RED FLAG exercises at Nellis Air Force Base (Top Gun was later replaced by the Naval Strike and Air Warfare Center at Naval Air Station Fallon). These aircraft were later supplemented and eventually replaced by F/A-18 Hornets, F-14 Tomcats, and F-16 Fighting Falcons, with the Air Force recently adding F-15 Eagles as well.

Vismods in the US Army

Following the example set by the Navy and Air Force, the United States Army developed the National Training Center at Fort Irwin, California. Due to the complex and intricate nature of modern mechanized warfare, the vismods used here cover a wide range of ground vehicles and even helicopters (UH-1 Hueys made to resemble the Mil Mi-8, for example), fitted with MILES gear. The most common vismods were M551 Sheridan light tanks which were dressed up to resemble Russian-made tanks and Infantry Fighting Vehicles such as the T-72 and BMP-1 and Humvees made to resemble BRDM-2 scout vehicles. As the Sheridans aged and grew harder and more inefficient to maintain, they were eventually replaced with M113 armored personnel carriers and M1 Abrams tanks. Similar vismod-equipped units also operate at the Joint Readiness Training Center at Fort Polk, Louisiana.

Vismods in film and television production

In some cases, vismods are used to simulate real-world military hardware that would be too expensive or otherwise impractical to procure for filming. Hollywood vismods have covered a wide range of vehicles, from aircraft (such as an Aérospatiale Puma made to resemble an Mi-24 Hind) to ground vehicles (Centurion tanks made to resemble M1 Abrams), and even small arms, such as Chinese-made Type 56 assault rifles being visually modified to resemble Soviet-made AKM or AK-74 rifles. Some of the more notable Hollywood vismod examples include Red Dawn and Courage Under Fire.

See also

 Opposing Force
 National Training Center
 Navy Fighter Weapons School
 Joint Readiness Training Center
 Naval Strike and Air Warfare Center
 RED FLAG exercise
 Multiple Integrated Laser Engagement System
 Wargaming
 Aggressor squadron

United States Department of Defense